William George Prudham,  (February 27, 1904 – August 24, 1974) was a Canadian politician.

Born in Kilbride (now Burlington), Ontario, he moved to Alberta as a young man and was elected to the House of Commons of Canada representing the riding of Edmonton West in the 1949 federal election. A Liberal, he was re-elected in 1953. In 1950, he was the Parliamentary Assistant to the Minister of Resources and Development. From 1950 to 1957, he served as the Minister of Mines and Technical Surveys in the ministry led by Prime Minister Louis St. Laurent. He did not seek re-election in 1957. After he stepped down from federal politics, Prudham served as an alderman on Edmonton City Council from 1959 to 1963.

References

Edmonton Public Library Biography of George Prudham

1904 births
1974 deaths
Businesspeople from Alberta
Businesspeople from Ontario
Edmonton city councillors
Liberal Party of Canada MPs
Members of the House of Commons of Canada from Alberta
Members of the King's Privy Council for Canada
Members of the United Church of Canada
People from Burlington, Ontario